The 2004 Tashkent Open was a women's tennis tournament played on hard courts at the Tashkent Tennis Center in Tashkent, Uzbekistan that was part of the Tier IV category of the 2004 WTA Tour. It was the sixth edition of the tournament and was held from 11 October through 17 October 2004. Unseeded Nicole Vaidišová won the singles title and earned $22,000 first-prize money.

Finals

Singles

 Nicole Vaidišová defeated  Virginie Razzano, 5–7, 6–3, 6–2
 It was Vaidišová's 2nd singles title of the year and of her career.

Doubles

 Adriana Serra Zanetti /  Antonella Serra Zanetti defeated  Marion Bartoli /  Mara Santangelo, 1–6, 6–3, 6–4

References

External links
 Official website
 ITF tournament edition details
 Tournament draws

 
Tashkent Open
Tashkent Open
Tashkent Open
Tashkent Open